Salavatabad or Salevatabad or Salvatabad or Salwatabad may refer to:
 Salavatabad, Bijar
 Salavatabad, Sanandaj
 Salavatabad (mountain)